is the twenty-second single by the Japanese rock band Buck-Tick, released on December 3, 2003. The song was used for TV Asahi's show Kiseki no Tobira TV no Chikara.

Track listing

Musicians

Atsushi Sakurai - vocals
Hisashi Imai - guitar
Hidehiko Hoshino - guitar
Yutaka Higuchi - bass
Toll Yagami - drums

References

2003 singles
Buck-Tick songs
2003 songs
Ariola Japan singles
Songs with lyrics by Atsushi Sakurai
Songs with music by Hidehiko Hoshino